Lloydolithus is a genus of Asaphid trilobite from the Late Ordovician of Wales.

References

Further reading 
 Geology in Shropshire by Peter Toghill

Trinucleidae
Asaphida genera
Late Ordovician animals
Ordovician trilobites of Europe
Ordovician Wales
Fossils of Wales
Fossil taxa described in 1933

Paleontology in Wales